The 1977 San Francisco general elections occurred on November 8, 1977, for all 11 newly created electoral districts to be represented in the Board of Supervisors for the 1978 fiscal year, as well as the position of City Attorney, the position of City Treasurer and a roster of 22 propositions (an extra proposition had been withdrawn from the ballot). It was the first time in San Francisco's history that Board elections were held on a districted basis rather than on a citywide at-large basis; in the November 1976 general election, voters in San Francisco decided to reorganize supervisor elections to choose supervisors from neighborhoods instead of voting for them in citywide ballots when they voted for Proposition T, which included the definition of the district boundaries.

Synopsis
The election was a watershed moment in the history of the city, as extremely fierce electoral campaigns immediately sprung into action. 113 candidates in total were registered in the total of all 11 districts.

Harvey Milk's campaign
One of the most memorable campaigns was that of Harvey Milk, a photographer, camera salesman, U.S. Navy veteran and prior candidate for the 1976 California State Assembly election who cut his teeth with campaigning in the Castro District and appealing to the LGBT voters of the area. He campaigned against sixteen other candidates for the District 5 post which covered the Castro, Haight-Ashbury and other local areas; the most successful candidate was the local lawyer Rick Stokes, who was backed by the Alice B. Toklas Memorial Democratic Club. However, Milk's campaign utilized a populist fervor and highly artistic displays in order to advertise the cause, leading even the San Francisco Chronicle to endorse his candidacy. Milk won the election with 30% of the vote against the other candidates.

Other campaigns
Other successful candidates included that of Carol Ruth Silver (described by the New York Times as the first un-wed mother to win a seat in the Board), Gordon Lau (the first Asian American member) and Ella Hill Hutch (the first African American female member). Dan White, a police officer and former firefighter, also won election for the first time.

Board of Supervisors

District 1
 Gordon Lau
 Ronald W. Anderson
 Thomas H. Bomar
 Bernard Finn Brady
 Bill Eisen
 Roger Grimes
 Don Hill
 Edward Lawson
 John Maloney
 Athanasius (Lou) Maunupau

District 2
 Dianne Feinstein

District 3
 John L. Molinari

District 4
 Ella Hill Hutch

District 5
 Harvey Milk
 Terence Hallinan
 Rick Stokes

District 6
 Carol Ruth Silver
 Gary Borvice

District 7
 Robert E. Gonzales

District 8
 Dan White
 Leonard Heinz

District 9
 Lee S. Dolson

District 10
 Quentin L. Kopp

District 11
 Ron Pelosi

City Attorney
 George Agnost
 Gil Graham
 Jim Reilly

City Treasurer
 Kay Pachtner
 Thomas C. Scanlon (inc)

Propositions
 (A) - Park Irrigation Bonds
 (B) - Fire Department Bonds
 (C) - Airport Revenue Bonds
 (D) - Airport Revenue Bond Procedure
 (E) - Duties of the Mayor
 (F) - Term of Chief Administrative Office
 (G) - Budget Reductions
 (H) - Dental Plan
 (I) - Pension Increase
 (J) - Disability Hearing Officers
 (K) - Supervisors' Administrative Assistant
 (L) - C.A.O.'s Executive Assistant
 (M) - Fire Department Promotional Exams
 (N) - Public Works Contract
 (O) - Progressive Payments
 (P) - Official Advertising
 (Q) - Electricians Salary Demands
 (R) - Plumbers Salary Demands
 (S) - Sheetmetal Workers Salary Demands
 T (Proposition T was officially withdrawn)
 (U) - Declaration of Policy: International Hotel
 (V) - Declaration of Policy: Fleishhacker Pool
 (W) - Declaration of Policy: Billboard Removal

Post-assassination
After both Harvey Milk and then-mayor George Moscone were assassinated by Dan White in 1978, the future of electoral districts were cast in doubt. Feinstein, serving as president of the Board during the 1978 fiscal year, was immediately made mayor in Moscone's stead to serve out his term (with Louise Renne replacing her in the Board seat), becoming the first female mayor in San Francisco's municipal history; she was elected to the position in the following mayoral election of 1983. Harry Britt was selected by Mayor Feinstein to succeed Milk, and would hold a seat on the council until 1993.

In 1980, districts were abolished and replaced by the original city-at-large slate for future elections; electoral districts were only revived beginning with the 2000 elections.

References

San Francisco Board of Supervisors
San Francisco Board of Supervisors
Board of Supervisors 1977
Elections Board of Supervisors
Harvey Milk
November 1977 events in the United States